An election to Laois County Council took place on 23 May 2014 as part of that year's Irish local elections. 19 councillors were elected from three electoral divisions by PR-STV voting for a five-year term of office, a reduction of 2 seats from the previous election in 2009. In addition Mountmellick Town Council and Portlaoise Town Council were both abolished.

Fianna Fáil became the largest party after the elections securing 7 Council seats. Fine Gael, by contrast, had a very poor set of results and lost half of their Council seats returning with just 6 seats in all. Sinn Féin doubled their representation to 2 seats and Labour retained a seat on the Council in the Portlaoise LEA. Independents make up the remainder of the Council membership.

Results by party

Results by Electoral Area

Borris-in-Ossory-Mountmellick

Graiguecullen-Portarlington

Portlaoise

References

Changes since Election
† On 4 April 2018 Portlaoise Fianna Fáil Cllr Jerry Lodge died following a short illness. Pauline Madigan was co-opted to fill the vacancy on 30 July 2018.

External links

2014 Irish local elections
2014